The VII Panzer Corps (VII Panzerkorps, 7th Armoured Corps) was a panzer corps of Nazi Germany during World War II.

History 

The headquarters were formed in East Prussia from the disbanded 49th Infantry Division under Army Group Centre on 18 December 1944. 
In February it fought under the 2nd Army, as part of Army Group Vistula and participated in the defence against the Soviet East Pomeranian Offensive. 

The Corps was commanded during its existence by General Mortimer von Kessel.

Order of battle
26 January 1945:
 Panzergrenadier Division Großdeutschland
 24th Panzer Division
 299th Infantry Division
 18th Panzergrenadier Division
 23rd Infantry Division

1 March 1945:
 4th SS Polizei Panzergrenadier Division
 7th Panzer Division

Sources
 VII. Panzerkorps on lexikon-der-wehrmacht.de

P007
Military units and formations established in 1944
Military units and formations disestablished in 1945